Subedar Arokia Rajiv (born 22 May 1991) is an Indian sprinter and a Junior Commissioned Officer (JCO) in Indian Army who specialises in the 400 metres distance. He won silver medals in the men's and mixed 4 × 400 m relays at the 2018 Asian Games and placed third in the individual 400 m in 2014. He won medals in both the 400 m and 4 × 400 m events at the 2016 South Asian Games and 2017 Asian Championships. He competed in the relay at the 2016 Summer Olympics. He competed in the 2020 Tokyo Olympics in the Men's  relay event where the Indian team broke the Asian and National Records and clocked a time of 3:00.25.

Early life
Rajiv was born in Tiruchirappalli, Tamil Nadu, in a poor family. He studied at the Government Boys Higher Secondary School, Lalgudi, and St. Joseph's College, Tiruchirappalli.

Career
Rajiv began his career as a long jumper before taking to 400 metres. At the 2019 Asian Championship, he Finished 4th Place, clocking 45.37 seconds in the final. In the process, he bettered his previous best of 45.92 seconds, which he had achieved at the Asian Games in Incheon on 28 th September 2014. Enrolled into the 8th Battalion of the Madras Regiment of Indian Army on March 15, 2011, Subedar Arokia Rajiv was honoured by the President of India Ram Nath Kovind in New Delhi with the prestigious Arjuna Award for his outstanding contribution in Athletics in 2017. Subedar Arokia Rajiv becomes the second Arjuna Awardee from the Madras Regiment after Havildar Peter Thangaraj who had received the Award for his outstanding achievements as India's football goalkeeper.

International competitions

1Did not finish in the final

References

External links

 

1991 births
Living people
Indian male sprinters
Asian Games medalists in athletics (track and field)
Athletes (track and field) at the 2014 Asian Games
Athletes (track and field) at the 2018 Asian Games
Athletes (track and field) at the 2018 Commonwealth Games
Sportspeople from Tiruchirappalli
Asian Games gold medalists for India
Asian Games silver medalists for India
Asian Games bronze medalists for India
Athletes (track and field) at the 2016 Summer Olympics
Athletes (track and field) at the 2020 Summer Olympics
Olympic athletes of India
Medalists at the 2014 Asian Games
Medalists at the 2018 Asian Games
Athletes from Tamil Nadu
Tamil sportspeople
South Asian Games gold medalists for India
South Asian Games medalists in athletics
Recipients of the Arjuna Award
Commonwealth Games competitors for India